Harry Leon Wolf (June 20, 1908 – November 10, 1993) was an American cinematographer. He won two Primetime Emmy Awards in the category Outstanding Cinematography for his work on the television programs Columbo and Baretta, and was nominated for a third for Little House on the Prairie. Wolf died in November 1993 in Los Angeles, California, at the age of 85.

References

External links 

1908 births
1993 deaths
People from San Francisco
American cinematographers
Primetime Emmy Award winners